Albert Popwell (July 15, 1926 – April 9, 1999) was an American stage, television and film actor with a career spanning six decades.

Born in New York City, Popwell started as a professional dancer before taking up a career in acting. Popwell made his professional debut on Broadway at age 16 in The Pirate.

Career
Popwell was featured on many television series, but is perhaps best known for his appearances in films opposite Clint Eastwood, with whom he appeared in five films, beginning with Coogan's Bluff (1968) and in the first four Dirty Harry films, playing a different character in each film. Popwell was the wounded bank robber at the receiving end of Eastwood's iconic "Do you feel lucky?" monologue from Dirty Harry (1971). He was a murderous pimp in Magnum Force (1973), appeared as militant Big Ed Mustapha in The Enforcer (1976) and as Harry's detective colleague Horace King in Sudden Impact (1983). In 1988, Popwell was offered a role in The Dead Pool, the last film in the series, but could not appear due to a scheduling conflict.

Popwell's final film role was with Sharon Stone in Scissors (1991). He died eight years later, at age 72, from complications following open heart surgery.

Selected filmography 

 Journey to Shiloh (1968) – Samuel
 Night Gallery (1970, episode: "The Nature of the Enemy") – Reporter
 Coogan's Bluff (1968) – Wonderful Digby
 Dirty Harry (1971) - Bank Robber 
 The Peace Killers (1971) – Blackjack
 Search (1972) – Griffin
 Glass Houses (1972) – Albert
 Fuzz (1972) – Lewis
 Cleopatra Jones (1973) – Matthew Johnson
 Charley Varrick (1973) – Percy Randolph
 Magnum Force (1973) – Pimp, J.J. Wilson
 The Single Girls (1974) – Morris
 Lost in the Stars (1974)
 Emergency! (1975, episode: "905-Wild") – Officer Les Taylor
 Cleopatra Jones and the Casino of Gold (1975) – Matthew Johnson
 The Streets of San Francisco (1975, episode: "Poisoned Snow") – Nappy
 Sanford and Son (1976, episode: "Sanford and Gong") – Doctor Davis
 The Enforcer (1976) – Big Ed Mustapha
 The Buddy Holly Story (1978) – Eddie
 Wonder Woman (1978, episode: "The Deadly Dolphin") – Gaffer
 Butterflies in Heat (1979) – Ned
 Buck Rogers in the 25th Century (1979, episode: "Cosmic Whiz Kid") – Koren
 The Incredible Hulk (1980, episode: "Long Run Home") - Doctor
 The A-Team (1983, episode: "The Out-Of Towners") – Digger
 Sudden Impact (1983) – Horace King
 Magnum, P.I. (1986, episode: "Missing Melody") – David Crawford
 Who's That Girl (1987) – Parole Chairman
 The Siege of Firebase Gloria (1989) – Jones
 Wild at Heart (1990) – Barkeeper at Zanzibar (scenes deleted)
 A Last Goodbye (1995) – O.C. Lee

References

External links 
 
 

1926 births
1999 deaths
American male film actors
American male stage actors
Male actors from New York City
African-American male actors
American male television actors
20th-century American male actors
20th-century African-American people